The 1976 Victorian state election, held on Saturday, 20 March 1976, was for the 47th Parliament of Victoria. It was held in the Australian state of Victoria to elect 81 members of the state's Legislative Assembly and 22 members of the 44-member Legislative Council. Since the previous election, there was an increase in the number of members of the Legislative Assembly by 8 and in the number of Council members by 8, though only 4 were elected at the 1976 election.

Since the last election, the number of Legislative Assembly members was increased from 73 to 81 and the number of seats in the Legislative Council was increased from 36 to 44.

The incumbent Liberal government led by Rupert Hamer was returned with an increased majority.

Results

Legislative Assembly

|}

Legislative Council

|}

Seats changing hands

Post-election pendulum

See also
Candidates of the 1976 Victorian state election

References

1976 elections in Australia
Elections in Victoria (Australia)
1970s in Victoria (Australia)
March 1976 events in Australia
John Cain